St. Andrews (Codroy Valley) Airport  is an airstrip located  northwest of the town of St. Andrews, Newfoundland and Labrador, Canada. It handles local flights connecting to Deer Lake Regional Airport.

References

Registered aerodromes in Newfoundland and Labrador